Abronia monticola is a species of lizard in the family Anguidae. The species is found in Costa Rica and Panama.

References

Abronia
Reptiles described in 1878
Reptiles of Costa Rica
Reptiles of Panama
Taxa named by Edward Drinker Cope